The Welfare Reform Act 2009 (c. 24) is an Act of the Parliament of the United Kingdom. It reforms the law relating to social security benefits.

See also
Welfare Reform Act

References
Halsbury's Statutes,

United Kingdom Acts of Parliament 2009
Social security in the United Kingdom